Other People's Trades is a collection of fifty-one essays written by Primo Levi between 1969 and 1985. According to Levi, the essays are "the fruit of my roaming about as a curious dilettante for more than a decade". Mainly written for his regular column in La Stampa, the Turin daily newspaper, the essays include book reviews, autobiographical snippets, exercises in homespun philosophy, and accounts of scientific curiosities.

The book was published in Italian by Einaudi in 1985. It was translated into English by Raymond Rosenthal and published by Summit Books in 1989.

Contents

My House
Butterflies
News from the Sky
Beetles
A Bottle of Sunshine
The Moon and Us
Inventing an Animal
The Leap of the Flea
Frogs on the Moon
Love's Erector Set
The Invisible World
A Long Duel
Grandfather's Store
Why Does One Write?
The Skull and the Orchid
The Best Goods
The Scribe
'The Most Joyful Creature in the World'
The Mark of the Chemist
Eclipse of the Prophet 
Stable/Unstable
The Language of Chemists (I)
The Language of Chemists (II)
The Book of Strange Data
Writing a Novel
François Rabelais
The Force of Amber
The Irritable Chess Players
Renzo's Fist
The Fear of Spiders
Novels Dictated by Crickets
Domum Servavit
On Obscure Writing
The Children's International
Going Back to School
Ex-Chemist
Signs on Stone
Against Pain
Thirty Hours on Castoro Sei
The Hidden Player
Ritual and Laughter
The Need and Fear
To a Young Reader

References 

Essay collections by Primo Levi
1985 books
Giulio Einaudi Editore books